Melanopsamma is a genus of fungi within the Niessliaceae family. The genus contains 41 species.

Species

Melanopsamma abscondita
Melanopsamma aggregata
Melanopsamma alpina
Melanopsamma amphisphaeria
Melanopsamma ampulligera
Melanopsamma anaxaea
Melanopsamma andina
Melanopsamma areolata
Melanopsamma australis
Melanopsamma balani
Melanopsamma balnei-ursi
Melanopsamma berberidis
Melanopsamma bolleana
Melanopsamma borealis
Melanopsamma buxiformis
Melanopsamma caespitula
Melanopsamma caraganae
Melanopsamma carpatica
Melanopsamma caulincola
Melanopsamma chilensis
Melanopsamma coffeicola
Melanopsamma confertissima
Melanopsamma congesta
Melanopsamma conospora
Melanopsamma cordobensis
Melanopsamma cormophila
Melanopsamma corticola
Melanopsamma cryptostoma
Melanopsamma cubigena
Melanopsamma cupressina
Melanopsamma cylindrospora
Melanopsamma depressa
Melanopsamma diana
Melanopsamma ellisii
Melanopsamma emergens
Melanopsamma emersa
Melanopsamma europaea
Melanopsamma fallax
Melanopsamma glandis
Melanopsamma graopsis
Melanopsamma herpotrichoides
Melanopsamma hyalodidyma
Melanopsamma hydrotheca
Melanopsamma hypophoea
Melanopsamma hypoxyloides
Melanopsamma improvisa
Melanopsamma incrustans
Melanopsamma indica
Melanopsamma interlamellaris
Melanopsamma jaapiana
Melanopsamma kansensis
Melanopsamma lanuginosa
Melanopsamma latericollis
Melanopsamma laurincola
Melanopsamma lettauiana
Melanopsamma lichenoides
Melanopsamma lophiostomoides
Melanopsamma martianoffiana
Melanopsamma melanostigma
Melanopsamma mendax
Melanopsamma merrillii
Melanopsamma minima
Melanopsamma moravica
Melanopsamma nipicola
Melanopsamma nitens
Melanopsamma nitida
Melanopsamma nucigena
Melanopsamma numerosa
Melanopsamma obtusa
Melanopsamma obtusella
Melanopsamma ossicola
Melanopsamma papilla
Melanopsamma parasitica
Melanopsamma patellata
Melanopsamma petrucciana
Melanopsamma phloeophytenta
Melanopsamma pomiformis
Melanopsamma pustula
Melanopsamma radicis
Melanopsamma ranjanii
Melanopsamma recessa
Melanopsamma ribis
Melanopsamma romelliana
Melanopsamma rosae
Melanopsamma saccardoana
Melanopsamma salicaria
Melanopsamma salicina
Melanopsamma salviae
Melanopsamma saxauli
Melanopsamma schizostomoides
Melanopsamma siemoniana
Melanopsamma sphaerelloides
Melanopsamma sphaeroidea
Melanopsamma subfasciculata
Melanopsamma subrhombispora
Melanopsamma suecica
Melanopsamma syringica
Melanopsamma tenerrima
Melanopsamma texensis
Melanopsamma umbratilis
Melanopsamma utahensis
Melanopsamma valdiviensis
Melanopsamma verrucosa
Melanopsamma waghornei
Melanopsamma yerbae

References

External links

Sordariomycetes genera
Niessliaceae